Charities Services, formerly known as the Charities Commission, is a New Zealand government agency established by the Charities Act 2005. Its responsibilities include:
maintaining and monitoring a register of charities
receiving annual returns and monitoring the activities of charities 
promoting public trust in charitable organisations 
providing education and assistance to the charitable sector 
encouraging best practice in governance and use of resources 
providing advice on matters relating to charities.

Charities Services is a division of the Department of Internal Affairs and has an independent three-person Board to make decisions about registering or deregistering charities.

References

External links
Charities Services

Government agencies of New Zealand
Organisations based in Wellington
Organizations established in 2005